Ode Thompson (born November 8, 1980) is a Nigerian football player currently playing for Eendracht Aalst. Thompson plays as a striker.

Thompson began his career in Nigeria with Julius Berger F.C. He moved to Belgium and signed a contract with First Division club K.A.A. Gent in 1996. After a loan spell with Standaard Wetteren he moved to K.R.C. Harelbeke.

After a very good season, he signed a contract with Belgian topclub R.S.C. Anderlecht. However, after a season with little playing time he began his football journey, which brought him to clubs like K.V.C. Westerlo, La Louvière, RBC Roosendaal, K.V. Oostende, Union, K.V.S.K. United, K.M.S.K. Deinze and K.S.V. Roeselare.

In 2009, he signed a contract with Third Division club K.S.V. Oudenaarde. For the 2011–12 season, he will join newly promoted Second Division side Eendracht Aalst.

Honours
Anderlecht
Belgian Super Cup: 2001

References

External links
 

1980 births
Living people
Nigerian footballers
Bridge F.C. players
K.A.A. Gent players
R.S.C. Anderlecht players
K.V.C. Westerlo players
R.A.A. Louviéroise players
RBC Roosendaal players
K.S.V. Roeselare players
Royale Union Saint-Gilloise players
S.C. Eendracht Aalst players
Belgian Pro League players
K.M.S.K. Deinze players
K.R.C. Zuid-West-Vlaanderen players
Association football forwards
Nigeria international footballers